Salvatore Caruso was the defending champion and chose not to defend his title.

Carlos Alcaraz won the title after defeating Damir Džumhur 4–6, 6–2, 6–1 in the final.

Seeds

Draw

Finals

Top half

Bottom half

References

External links
Main draw
Qualifying draw

Sánchez-Casal Cup - Singles